Idiognathodontidae is an extinct conodont family.

Genera are Gnathodus, Idiognathodus, and Protognathodus.

References

External links 

 Idiognathodontidae at fossilworks.org (retrieved 30 April 2016)

Ozarkodinida families